Siphlophis is a genus of snakes of the family Colubridae. The genus is endemic to the Americas.

Geographic range
Species of the genus Siphlophis are found in northern South America and Central America.

Species
The following seven species are recognized as being valid.
Siphlophis ayauma 
Siphlophis cervinus 
Siphlophis compressus 
Siphlophis leucocephalus 
Siphlophis longicaudatus 
Siphlophis pulcher 
Siphlophis worontzowi 

Nota bene: A binomial authority in parentheses indicates that the species was originally described in a genus other than Siphlophis.

Etymology
The specific name, worontzowi, is in honor of Brazilian entomologist Cesar Worontzow.

References

Further reading
Fitzinger L (1843). Systema Reptilium, Fasciculus Primus, Amblyglossae. Vienna: Braumüller & Seidel. 106 pp. + indices. (Siphlophis, new genus, p. 27). (in Latin).
Freiberg M (1982). Snakes of South America. Hong Kong: T.F.H. Publications. 189 pp. . (Genus Siphlophis, p. 110).

Siphlophis
Snake genera